Stop Draggin Me Down is the debut album by the Bellingham, Washington-based garage rock group The Mono Men, released in 1990.

Background

Stop Draggin Me Down is the only studio record to feature guitarist Marc "Marx" Wright. There were 3,000 copies of "Stop Draggin Me Down" pressed. The first 500 copies featured transparent yellow vinyl. The cover art for the album was done by Phil White and designed by Art Chantry.

Critical reception
Trouser Press wrote that "while the Men are heard at their best on singles — if you need proof, check out any of the three dozen (!) or so they’ve released — there’s enough dynamic sense in the band’s bag of tricks to sustain an album without ramalama burnout."

LP track listing

Personnel 
The Mono Men
 Dave Crider – guitar vocals
 Marc "Marx" Wright – guitar vocals
 Ledge Morrisette – bass guitar 
 Aaron Roeder – drums
 Josie Cat – organ on "Reptile"

Production
Produced by Richard Head
Engineered by Conrad Uno
Executive Producer Jay Haskins
Cover concept by Art Chantry; done by Phil White

References

1990 debut albums
Mono Men albums